John Dugan (born January 7, 1953) is an American actor. He is best known for his role in The Texas Chain Saw Massacre (1974) and Texas Chainsaw 3D (2013) as Grandpa Sawyer. He also had a cameo appearance in the fourth installment of that series, Texas Chainsaw Massacre: The Next Generation.

Dugan took a hiatus from acting until the 2000s, when he started making appearances and acting in independent films again, appearing in features produced by Horror Wasteland Pictures International. He played Dr. Harper in Bobby Easleys adaptation of Stephen Kings The Boogeyman (2014) and All Sinners Night (2014). John has most recently been seen in The Hospital opposite actor/stuntman Jim O'Rear. 2015 starred in Tony Moran's biopic Horror Icon: Inside Michael’s Mask with Tony Moran. Dugan also stars in the 2016 psychological thriller drama Devils Ink as a corrupt politician who is also an abusive father. He also plays as the iconic Col Talaska in Horror Wasteland Pictures WW2 stop-motion film The Devil Dogs of Kilo Company (2016) as well as Grandpa McCormick in the horror-western Belly Timber (2016).

Filmography

Film

References

External links

 

1953 births
Living people
People from Brazil, Indiana
Male actors from Indiana